Hello, I Must Be Going may refer to:

Film and TV

Film 
 Hello I Must Be Going (2012 film), a 2012 film directed by Todd Louiso
 Hello I Must Be Going (2014 film), a 2014 film directed by Courteney Cox

TV 
Hello, I Must Be Going (Casualty), the 2016 episode (Series 30, Episode 34) of the British medical drama Casualty.

Music 

"Hello, I Must Be Going" (song), a song by Bert Kalmar and Harry Ruby, made famous by Groucho Marx
Hello, I Must Be Going! (album), a 1982 album by Phil Collins

Books 

 Hello, I Must Be Going! (book), a biography of Groucho Marx by Charlotte Chandler